The United Socialist Party (Eksath Samajavadi Pakshaya, Aikkiy soōcialica Kaṭci) is a Trotskyist political party in Sri Lanka. It is affiliated to the Committee for a Workers' International.

History
The USP traces its history back to the main opposition left group in the Lanka Sama Samaja Party, the Vama Samasamaja. This group were introduced to what was to become the Committee for a Workers' International (CWI) in the 1970s. The Vama Samasamaja became the Nava Sama Samaja Party when it separated from the LSSP in December 1977 following a number of expulsions from the LSSP starting in 1972.

The NSSP was a section of the CWI from its foundation until it left in 1989. Disagreements on areas of theory and policy (such as the analysis of Stalinism) with the CWI eventually led to a split. One disagreement was over the leaders of the NSSP deciding to support the 1987 Indo-Sri Lanka Accord, which led to the deployment of the Indian Peace Keeping Force, in a document issued on 12 February 1988. After 1989 the NSSP became a section of the United Secretariat of the Fourth International, while those still supporting the CWI became the USP.

Criticism against India

Sri Lankan Civil War
The USP criticised the Indian government for providing military support to the Sri Lankan government whose armed forces were conducting a campaign against opposition in the north of the country. The party opposed the Rajapaksa government's militarist solution to the country's civil war, holding the position that military victory in the Tamil-dominated areas will not solve the national question, with ill feeling and further violence likely as a result.  USP General Secretary, Siritunga Jayasuriya, is also quoted as saying that the government's military operation was a "war not against LTTE cadre, but against the Tamil people."

Elections
In the 2005 Sri Lankan presidential election, its candidate, Siritunga Jayasuriya, came third with 35,425 votes(0.36%).

In the 2006 council elections, the USP won 710 votes (2.37%) in Eheliyagoda Pradeseheeya Sabha (Ratnapura District), winning a seat in the council.

References

External links
United Socialist Party
Committee for a Workers' International

1977 establishments in Sri Lanka
Communist parties in Sri Lanka
Political parties established in 1977
Sri Lanka
Trotskyist organisations in Sri Lanka
Indian Peace Keeping Force